Ermischiella nigriceps is a species of beetle in the genus Ermischiella. It was described in 1975.

References

Mordellidae
Beetles described in 1975